Muaythai was featured in the World Combat Games official programme for the first time at the 2010 World Combat Games in Beijing, China. It has been played at all editions since then. The International Federation of Muaythai Associations is governing body for muaythai at the World Combat Games.

Summary

Events
The muaythai competition is organized as a set of tournaments, one for each weight class.  The number of weight classes has never changed in the two editions (currently 8 for men and 3 for women), and the definition of each class has changed several times, as shown in the following table. Weights were measured in kilograms.

Venues
For the World Combat Games, there have been two venues that have been or be used to host muaythai.

Medal table
The numbers below are after the 2013 World Combat Games in Saint Petersburg, Russia.

Notes

References

 
Sports at the World Combat Games
World Combat Games